Jimmy Margulies (born October 8, 1951) is an American editorial cartoonist. His work appears daily in AM New York and on the website of Newsday, and is distributed nationally to over 425 papers by King Features Syndicate. His cartoons appear regularly in Time, Newsweek, The New York Times and USA Today.

Publications
Margulies has two collections of his cartoons published ...My Husband is Not a Wimp! (1988), and Hitting Below the Beltway (1998).

Awards and recognition
Margulies has won the National Headliner Award and Fischetti Editorial Cartoon Competition (1996), and the Barryman Award from the National Press Foundation (2005). The National Rifle Association placed him on their blacklist, which he considers a badge of honor.

In its 2009 "Best of Everything" lists, Time magazine listed Margulies's "Save the Women and Children... and my bonus too" as its top editorial cartoon of the year.

References

External links
Cartoons at AM New York
Cartoons at Comics Kingdom

1951 births
Living people
American editorial cartoonists